Andrei Pavlovich Sokolov; born 22 January 1968) is a  Kazakhstani retired ice hockey player.

Career 
During his career, Sokolov played for several teams in Russia and Kazakhstan. Sokolov also played for the Kazakhstani national team at the 1998 Winter Olympic Games and multiple Ice Hockey World Championships.

Career statistics

Regular season and playoffs

International

References

External links

1968 births
Living people
Detroit Falcons (CoHL) players
HC Sibir Novosibirsk players
Ice hockey players at the 1998 Winter Olympics
Kazakhstani ice hockey defencemen
Kazzinc-Torpedo players
Metallurg Magnitogorsk players
Olympic ice hockey players of Kazakhstan
Sportspeople from Oskemen
Soviet ice hockey defencemen
Kazakhstani expatriate sportspeople in the United States
Kazakhstani expatriate ice hockey people
Kazakhstani expatriate sportspeople in Russia
Expatriate ice hockey players in the United States
Expatriate ice hockey players in Russia